"Alive" is a song by American electronic dance music group Krewella. The song was originally released in June 2012 as the third single from their debut EP Play Hard, but was re-released in February 2013. The song was the group's first and only top 40 hit on the US Billboard Hot 100, charting at 32. It is also featured on their debut album, Get Wet (2013).

Music video
The video for the song was released onto Vimeo on December 5, 2012, and on YouTube and Vevo on December 18, 2012. The video shows the band in a desert dancing, starting a fire (on which a plush panda is later seen burning) and smashing the walls of a vandalized house and other objects with bats.

Track listing

Charts and certifications

Weekly charts

Year-end charts

Certifications

References 

2012 songs
2013 singles
Columbia Records singles
Krewella songs